Marjorie Deane  (1914 - 2 October 2008) was a British financial journalist and author, who worked for The Economist from 1947 to 1989, and has been called "a pathbreaker for female financial journalists" by Paul Volcker, the former chairman of the US Federal Reserve.

Early life
Marjorie Deane was born in 1914 in Manchester. She was educated there at Withington Girls' School, followed by a degree in mathematics at London University.

Career
During the Second World war, Deane worked as a statistician for the Admiralty, where she reported to the poet John Betjeman, who would become a friend.

Deane worked for The Economist from 1947 to 1989, and in the magazine's obituary of Deane, she was described as "the backbone of The Economists financial coverage". She was initially hired as a statistician, and although The Economist were relatively enlightened employers, this did not extend to equal pay in her earlier years; according to the editor Geoffrey Crowther, "You can hire a first-rate woman for the price of a second-rate man".

Deane retired from The Economist aged 75, but continued working on a consultancy basis for various employers, and published a book aged 80 with the journalist Robert Pringle, entitled, The Central Banks.

Paul Volcker, the former chairman of the US Federal Reserve, has called Deane "a pathbreaker for female financial journalists".

Honours
In 2006, Deane was awarded an MBE, and said to the Queen: "I gather you don't much like us journalists, Ma’am", to which the Queen replied that financial journalists were all right.

Personal life
She died on 2 October 2008, at the age of 94.

Legacy
In 1998, she put £1 million towards establishing up a foundation to encourage young financial journalists, and most of her estate was added to The Marjorie Deane Financial Journalism Foundation.

Selected publications
 The Central Banks (with Robert Pringle, 1994)

References

External links
 The Marjorie Deane Financial Journalism Foundation

1914 births
2008 deaths
British writers
British women journalists
People educated at Withington Girls' School